Walter Vaughan may refer to:

 Walter Vaughan (MP for Wiltshire)
 Walter Vaughan (MP for Carmarthenshire)